Since ancient times, Greeks, Etruscans and Celts have inhabited the south, centre and north of the Italian peninsula respectively. The very numerous rock drawings in Valcamonica are as old as 8,000 BC, and there are rich remains of Etruscan art from thousands of tombs, as well as rich remains from the Greek colonies at Paestum, Agrigento and elsewhere. Ancient Rome finally emerged as the dominant Italian and European power. The Roman remains in Italy are of extraordinary richness, from the grand Imperial monuments of Rome itself to the survival of exceptionally preserved ordinary buildings in Pompeii and neighbouring sites. Following the fall of the Roman Empire, in the Middle Ages Italy, especially the north, remained an important centre, not only of the Carolingian art and Ottonian art of the Holy Roman Emperors, but for the Byzantine art of Ravenna and other sites.

Italy was the main centre of artistic developments throughout the Renaissance (1300-1600), beginning with the Proto-Renaissance of Giotto and reaching a particular peak in the High Renaissance of Leonardo da Vinci, Michelangelo and Raphael, whose works inspired the later phase of the Renaissance, known as Mannerism. Italy retained its artistic dominance into the 17th century with the Baroque (1600-1750), and into the 18th century with Neoclassicism (1750-1850). In this period, cultural tourism became a major prop to Italian economy. Both Baroque and Neoclassicism originated in Rome and spread to all Western art. Italy maintained a presence in the international art scene from the mid-19th century onwards, with movements such as the Macchiaioli, Futurism, Metaphysical, Novecento Italiano, Spatialism, Arte Povera, and Transavantgarde.
 
Italian art has influenced several major movements throughout the centuries and has produced several great artists, including painters, architects and sculptors. Today, Italy has an important place in the international art scene, with several major art galleries, museums and exhibitions; major artistic centres in the country include Rome, Florence, Venice, Milan, Turin, Genoa, Naples, Palermo, Syracuse and other cities. Italy is home to 58 World Heritage Sites, the largest number of any country in the world.

Etruscan art 

Etruscan bronze figures and a terracotta funerary reliefs include examples of a vigorous Central Italian tradition which had waned by the time Rome began building her empire on the peninsula.

The Etruscan paintings that have survived to modern times are mostly wall frescoes from graves, and mainly from Tarquinia. These are the most important example of pre-Roman figurative art in Italy known to scholars.

The frescoes consist of painting on top of fresh plaster, so that when the plaster is dried the painting becomes part of the plaster and an integral part of the wall, which helps it survive so well (indeed, almost all of surviving Etruscan and Roman painting is in fresco). Colours were made from stones and minerals in different colours that ground up and mixed in a medium, and fine brushes were made of animal hair (even the best brushes are produced with ox hair). From the mid 4th century BC chiaroscuro began to be used to portray depth and volume. Sometimes scenes of everyday life are portrayed, but more often traditional mythological scenes. The concept of proportion does not appear in any surviving frescoes and we frequently find portrayals of animals or men with some body-parts out of proportion. One of the best-known Etruscan frescoes is that of Tomb of the Lioness at Tarquinia.

Roman art 

The Etruscan were responsible for constructing Rome's earliest monumental buildings. Roman temples and houses were closely based on Etruscan models. Elements of Etruscan influence in Roman temples included the podium and the emphasis on the front at the expense of the remaining three sides. Large Etruscan houses were grouped around a central hall in much the same way as Roman town Large houses were later built around an atrium. The influence of Etruscan architecture gradually declined during the republic in the face of influences (particularly Greek) from elsewhere. The Etruscan architecture was itself influenced by the Greeks so that when the Romans adopted Greek styles, it was not a totally alien culture. During the republic, there was probably a steady absorption of architectural influences, mainly from the Hellenistic world, but after the fall of Syracuse in 211 BC, Greek works of art flooded into Rome. During the 2nd century BC, the flow of these works, and more important, Greek craftsmen, continued, thus decisively influencing the development of Roman architecture. By the end of the republic, when Vitruvius wrote his treatise on architecture, Greek architectural theory and example were dominant. With the expansion of the empire, Roman architecture spread over a wide area, used for both public buildings and some larger private ones. In many areas, elements of style were influenced by local tastes, particularly decoration, but the architecture remained recognizably Roman. Styles of vernacular architecture were influenced to varying degrees by Roman architecture, and in many regions, Roman and native elements are found combined in the same building.

By the 1st century AD, Rome had become the biggest and most advanced city in the world. The ancient Romans came up with new technologies to improve the city's sanitation systems, roads, and buildings. They developed a system of aqueducts that piped freshwater into the city, and they built sewers that removed the city's waste. The wealthiest Romans lived in large houses with gardens. Most of the population, however, lived in apartment buildings made of stone, concrete, or limestone. The Romans developed new techniques and used materials such as volcanic soil from Pozzuoli, a village near Naples, to make their cement harder and stronger. This concrete allowed them to build large apartment buildings called  insulae.

Wall paintings decorated the houses of the wealthy. Paintings often showed garden landscapes, events from Greek and Roman mythology, historical scenes, or scenes of everyday life. Romans decorated floors with mosaics — pictures or designs created with small colored tiles. The richly colored paintings and mosaics helped to make rooms in Roman houses seem larger and brighter and showed off the wealth of the owner.

In the Christian era of the late Empire, from 350 to 500 AD, wall painting, mosaic ceiling and floor work, and funerary sculpture thrived, while full-sized sculpture in the round and panel painting died out, most likely for religious reasons. When Constantine moved the capital of the empire to Byzantium (renamed Constantinople), Roman art incorporated Eastern influences to produce the Byzantine style of the late empire. When Rome was sacked in the 5th century, artisans moved to and found work in the Eastern capital. The Church of Hagia Sophia in Constantinople employed nearly 10,000 workmen and artisans, in a final burst of Roman art under Emperor Justinian I, who also ordered the creation of the famous mosaics of Ravenna.

Medieval art 

Throughout the Middle Ages, Italian art consisted primarily of architectural decorations (frescoes and mosaics). Byzantine art in Italy was a highly formal and refined decoration with standardized calligraphy and admirable use of color and gold. Until the 13th century, art in Italy was almost entirely regional, affected by external European and Eastern currents. After c. 1250 the art of the various regions developed characteristics in common, so that a certain unity, as well as great originality, is observable.

Byzantine art 

With the fall of its western capital, the Roman Empire continued for another 1000 years under the leadership of Constantinople. Byzantine artisans were used in important projects throughout Italy, and Byzantine styles of painting can be found up to the 14th century.

Gothic art 

The Gothic period marks a transition from the medieval to the Renaissance and is characterized by the styles and attitudes nurtured by the influence of the Dominican and Franciscan order of monks, founded by Saint Dominic and Saint Francis of Assisi respectively.

It was a time of religious disputes within the church. The Franciscans and Dominicans were founded in an attempt to address these disputes and bring the Catholic Church back to basics. The early days of the Franciscans are remembered especially for the compassion of Saint Francis, while the Dominicans are remembered as the order most responsible for the beginnings of the Inquisition.

Gothic architecture began in northern Europe and spread southward to Italy.

Renaissance art 

During the Middle Ages, painters and sculptors tried to give their works a spiritual quality. They wanted viewers to concentrate on the deep religious meaning of their paintings and sculptures. But Renaissance painters and sculptors, like Renaissance writers, wanted to portray people and nature realistically. Medieval architects designed huge cathedrals to emphasize the grandeur of God and to humble the human spirit. Renaissance architects designed buildings whose proportions were based on those of the human body and whose ornamentation imitated ancient designs.

Arts of the 14th century and early 15th century 

During the early 14th century, the Florentine painter Giotto became the first artist to portray nature realistically since the fall of the Roman Empire. He produced magnificent frescoes (paintings on damp plaster) for churches in Assisi, Florence, Padua, and Rome. Giotto attempted to create lifelike figures showing real emotions. He portrayed many of his figures in realistic settings.

A remarkable group of Florentine architects, painters, and sculptors worked during the early 15th century. They included the painter Masaccio, the sculptor Donatello, and the architect Filippo Brunelleschi.

Masaccio's finest work was a series of frescoes he painted about 1427 in the Brancacci Chapel of the Church of Santa Maria del Carmine in Florence. The frescoes realistically show Biblical scenes of emotional intensity. In these paintings, Masaccio utilized Brunelleschi's system for achieving linear perspective.

In his sculptures, Donatello tried to portray the dignity of the human body in realistic and often dramatic detail. His masterpieces include three statues of the Biblical hero David. In a version finished in the 1430s, Donatello portrayed David as a graceful, nude youth, moments after he slew the giant Goliath.

Brunelleschi was the first Renaissance architect to revive the ancient Roman style of architecture. He used arches, columns, and other elements of classical architecture in his designs. One of his best-known buildings is the beautifully and harmoniously proportioned Pazzi Chapel in Florence. The chapel, begun in 1442 and completed about 1465, was one of the first buildings designed in the new Renaissance style. Brunelleschi also was the first Renaissance artist to master linear perspective, a mathematical system with which painters could show space and depth on a flat surface.

Arts of the late 15th century and early 16th century 

Arts of the late 15th century and early 16th century were dominated by three men. They were Michelangelo, Raphael, and Leonardo da Vinci.

Michelangelo excelled as a painter, architect, and poet. In addition, he has been called the greatest sculptor in history. Michelangelo was a master of portraying the human figure. For example, his famous statue of the Israelite leader Moses (1516) gives an overwhelming impression of physical and spiritual power. These qualities also appear in the frescoes of Biblical and classical subjects that Michelangelo painted on the ceiling of the Vatican's Sistine Chapel. The frescoes, painted from 1508 to 1512, rank among the greatest works of Renaissance art.

Raphael's paintings are softer in outline and more poetic than those of Michelangelo. Raphael was skilled in creating perspective and in the delicate use of color. He painted a number of beautiful pictures of the Madonna (Virgin Mary) and many outstanding portraits. One of his greatest works is the fresco The School of Athens. The painting was influenced by classical Greek and Roman models. It portrays the great philosophers and scientists of ancient Greece in a setting of classical arches. Raphael was thus making a connection between the culture of classical antiquity and the Italian culture of his time.

Leonardo da Vinci painted two of the most famous works of Renaissance art, the wallpainting The Last Supper and the portrait Mona Lisa. Leonardo had one of the most searching minds in all history. He wanted to know how everything that he saw in nature worked. In over 4,000 pages of notebooks, he drew detailed diagrams and wrote his observations. Leonardo made careful drawings of human skeletons and muscles, trying to learn how the body worked. Due to his inquiring mind, Leonardo has become a symbol of the Renaissance spirit of learning and intellectual curiosity.

The creator of High Renaissance architecture was Donato Bramante, who came to Rome in 1499, when he was 55. His first Roman masterpiece, the Tempietto (1502) at San Pietro in Montorio, is a centralized dome structure that recalls Classical temple architecture. Pope Julius II chose Bramante to be papal architect, and together they devised a plan to replace the 4th-century Old St. Peter's with a new church of gigantic dimensions. The project was not completed, however, until long after Bramante's death.

Humanistic studies continued under the powerful popes of the High Renaissance, Julius II and Leo X, as did the development of polyphonic music. The Sistine Choir, which p\d, drew musicians and singers from all of Italy and northern Europe. Among the most famous composers who became members were Josquin des Prez and Giovanni Pierluigi da Palestrina.

Mannerism 

Mannerism was an elegant, courtly style. It flourished in Florence, Italy, where its leading representatives were Giorgio Vasari and Bronzino. The style was introduced to the French court by Rosso Fiorentino and by Francesco Primaticcio. The Venetian painter Tintoretto was influenced by the style.

The mannerist approach to painting also influenced other arts.

In architecture, the work of Italian architect Giulio Romano is a notable example. The Italian Benvenuto Cellini and Flemish born Giambologna were the style's chief representatives in sculpture.

Some historians regard this period as degeneration of High Renaissance classicism or even as an interlude between High Renaissance and baroque, in which case the dates are usually from c. 1520 to 1600, and it is considered a positive style complete in itself.

Baroque and Rococo Art 

[[File:The Calling of Saint Matthew-Caravaggo (1599-1600).jpg|thumb|right|300px|Caravaggio's The Calling of St. Matthew]], 1599-1600

In the early 17th century Rome became the center of a renewal of Italian dominance in the arts. In Parma, Antonio da Correggio decorated church vaults with lively figures floating softly on clouds – a scheme that was to have a profound influence on baroque ceiling paintings. The stormy chiaroscuro paintings of Caravaggio and the robust, illusionistic paintings of the Bolognese Carracci family gave rise to the baroque period in Italian art. Domenichino, Francesco Albani, and later Andrea Sacchi were among those who carried out the classical implications in the art of the Carracci.

On the other hand, Guido Reni, Guercino, Orazio Gentileschi, Giovanni Lanfranco, and later Pietro da Cortona and Andrea Pozzo, while thoroughly trained in a classical-allegorical mode, were at first inclined to paint dynamic compositions full of gesticulating figures in a manner closer to that of Caravaggio. The towering virtuoso of baroque exuberance and grandeur in sculpture and architecture was Gian Lorenzo Bernini. Toward 1640 many of the painters leaned toward the classical style that had been brought to the fore in Rome by the French expatriate Nicolas Poussin. The sculptors Alessandro Algardi and François Duquesnoy also tended toward the classical. Notable late baroque artists include the Genoese Giovanni Battista Gaulli and the Neapolitans Luca Giordano and Francesco Solimena.

The leading lights of the 18th century came from Venice. Among them were the brilliant exponent of the rococo style, Giovanni Battista Tiepolo; the architectural painters Francesco Guardi, Canaletto, Giovanni Battista Piazzetta, and Bernardo Bellotto; and the engraver of Roman antiquities, Giovanni Battista Piranesi.

Italian Neoclassical and 19th-century art 

As in other parts of Europe, Italian Neoclassical art was mainly based on the principles of Ancient Roman and Ancient Greek art and architecture, but also by the Italian Renaissance architecture and its basics, such as in the Villa Capra "La Rotonda".

Classicism and Neoclassicism in Italian art and architecture developed during the Italian Renaissance, notably in the writings and designs of Leon Battista Alberti and the work of Filippo Brunelleschi. It places emphasis on symmetry, proportion, geometry and the regularity of parts as they are demonstrated in the architecture of Classical antiquity and in particular, the architecture of Ancient Rome, of which many examples remained. Orderly arrangements of columns, pilasters and lintels, as well as the use of semicircular arches, hemispherical domes, niches and aedicules replaced the more complex proportional systems and irregular profiles of medieval buildings. This style quickly spread to other Italian cities and later to the rest of continental Europe.

The sculptor Antonio Canova was a leading exponent of the neoclassic style. Internationally famous, he was regarded as the most brilliant sculptor in Europe.

Francesco Hayez is the greatest exponent of Romanticism in Italy: many of his works, usually of Medieval setting, contain an encrypted patriotic Risorgimento message.

The Macchiaioli 

Italy produced its own form of Impressionism, the Macchiaioli artists, who were actually there first, before the more famous Impressionists: Giovanni Fattori, Silvestro Lega, Telemaco Signorini, Giuseppe Abbati. The Macchiaioli artists were forerunners to Impressionism in France. They believed that areas of light and shadow, or macchie (literally patches or spots) were the chief components of a work of art. The word macchia was commonly used by Italian artists and critics in the 19th century to describe the sparkling quality of a drawing or painting, whether due to a sketchy and spontaneous execution or to the harmonious breadth of its overall effect.

A hostile review published on November 3, 1862, in the journal Gazzetta del Popolo marks the first appearance in print of the term Macchiaioli. The term carried several connotations: it mockingly implied that the artists' finished works were no more than sketches, and recalled the phrase "darsi alla macchia", meaning, idiomatically, to hide in the bushes or scrubland. The artists did, in fact, paint much of their work in these wild areas. This sense of the name also identified the artists with outlaws, reflecting the traditionalists' view that new school of artists was working outside the rules of art, according to the strict laws defining artistic expression at the time.

Italian modern and contemporary art 

Early in the 20th century the exponents of futurism developed a dynamic vision of the modern world while Giorgio de Chirico expressed a strange metaphysical quietude and Amedeo Modigliani joined the school of Paris. Gifted later modern artists include the sculptors Giacomo Manzù, Marino Marini, the still-life painter Giorgio Morandi, and the iconoclastic painter Lucio Fontana. In the second half of the 20th century, Italian designers, particularly those of Milan, have profoundly influenced international styles with their imaginative and ingenious functional works.

Futurism 

Futurism was an Italian art movement that flourished from 1909 to about 1916. It was the first of many art movements that tried to break with the past in all areas of life. Futurism glorified the power, speed, and excitement that characterized the machine age. From the French Cubist painters and multiple-exposure photography, the Futurists learned to break up realistic forms into multiple images and overlapping fragments of color. By such means, they attempted to portray the energy and speed of modern life. In literature, Futurism demanded the abolition of traditional sentence structures and verse forms.

Futurism was first announced on Feb. 20, 1909, when the Paris newspaper Le Figaro published a manifesto by the Italian poet and editor Filippo Tommaso Marinetti. (See the Manifesto of Futurism.) Marinetti coined the word Futurism to reflect his goal of discarding the art of the past and celebrating change, originality, and innovation in culture and society. Marinetti's manifesto glorified the new technology of the automobile and the beauty of its speed, power, and movement. Exalting violence and conflict, he called for the sweeping repudiation of traditional values and the destruction of cultural institutions such as museums and libraries. The manifesto's rhetoric was passionately bombastic; its aggressive tone was purposely intended to inspire public anger and arouse controversy.

Marinetti's manifesto inspired a group of young painters in Milan to apply Futurist ideas to the visual arts. Umberto Boccioni, Carlo Carrà, Luigi Russolo, Giacomo Balla, and Gino Severini published several manifestos on painting in 1910. Like Marinetti, they glorified originality and expressed their disdain for inherited artistic traditions.

Boccioni also became interested in sculpture, publishing a manifesto on the subject in the spring of 1912. He is considered to have most fully realized his theories in two sculptures, Development of a Bottle in Space (1912), in which he represented both the inner and outer contours of a bottle, and Unique Forms of Continuity in Space (1913), in which a human figure is not portrayed as one solid form but is instead composed of the multiple planes in space through which the figure moves.
Realistic principles extended to architecture as well. Antonio Sant'Elia formulated a Futurist manifesto on architecture in 1914. His visionary drawings of highly mechanized cities and boldly modern skyscrapers prefigure some of the most imaginative 20th-century architectural planning.

Boccioni, who had been the most talented artist in the group, and Sant'Elia both died during military service in 1916. Boccioni's death, combined with expansion of the group's personnel and the sobering realities of the devastation caused by World War I, effectively brought an end to the Futurist movement as an important historical force in the visual arts.

Metaphysical art 

Metaphysical Painting is an Italian art movement, born in 1917 with the work of Carlo Carrà and Giorgio de Chirico in Ferrara. The word metaphysical, adopted by De Chirico himself, is core to the poetics of the movement.

They depicted a dreamlike imagery, with figures and objects seemingly frozen in time. Metaphysical Painting artists accept the representation of the visible world in a traditional perspective space, but the unusual arrangement of human beings as dummy-like models, objects in strange, illogical contexts, the unreal lights and colors, the unnatural static of still figures.

Novecento Italiano 

Novecento movement, group of Italian artists, formed in 1922 in Milan, that advocated a return to the great Italian representational art of the past.
 
The founding members of the Novecento (Italian: 20th-century) movement were the critic Margherita Sarfatti and seven artists: Anselmo Bucci, Leonardo Dudreville, Achille Funi, Gian Emilio Malerba, Piero Marussig, Ubaldo Oppi, and Mario Sironi. Under Sarfatti's leadership, the group sought to renew Italian art by rejecting European avant-garde movements and embracing Italy's artistic traditions.

Other artists associated with the Novecento included the sculptors Marino Marini and Arturo Martini and the painters Ottone Rosai, Massimo Campigli, Carlo Carrà, and Felice Casorati.

Spatialism 

Movement founded by the Italian artist Lucio Fontana as the movimento spaziale, its tenets were repeated in manifestos between 1947 and 1954.

Combining elements of concrete art, dada and tachism, the movement's adherents rejected easel painting and embraced new technological developments, seeking to incorporate time and movement in their works. Fontana's slashed and pierced paintings exemplify his theses.

Arte Povera 

Arte Povera an artistic movement that originated in Italy in the 1960s, combining aspects of conceptual, minimalist, and performance art, and making use of worthless or common materials such as earth or newspaper, in the hope of subverting the commercialization of art. The phrase is Italian, and means literally, "impoverished art."

Transavantgarde 

The term Transavantgarde is the invention of the Italian critic Achille Bonito Oliva. He has defined Transavantgarde art as traditional in format (that is, mostly painting or sculpture); apolitical; and, above all else, eclectic.

List of major museums and galleries in Italy

Advocacy and restrictions 
According to the 2017 amendments to the Italian Codice dei beni culturali e del paesaggio, a work of art can be legally defined of public and cultural interest if it was completed at least 70 years before. The previous limit was 50 years. To make easier the exportations and the international commerce of art goods as a store of value, for the first time it was given to the private owners and their dealers the faculty to self-certify a commercial value less than 13.500 euros, in order to be authorized to transport goods out of the country's borders and into the European Union, with no need of a public administrative permission.
The bill has passed and come into force on August 29, 2017. A public authorization shall be provided for archeological remains discovered underground or under the sea level.

See also 

 Italian literature
 History of Italy
 Culture of Italy

References

External links 
  Italian Art. kdfineart-italia.com. Web. 5 Oct. 2011.
  Italian and Tuscan style Fine Art. italianartstudio.com. Web. 5 Oct. 2011.
  Italian art notes

 
 Art
Art by country
European art
Western art